The 1981 Oklahoma State Cowboys football team represented Oklahoma State University in the Big Eight Conference during the 1981 NCAA Division I-A football season. In their third season under head coach Jimmy Johnson, the Cowboys compiled a 7–5 record (4–3 against conference opponents), tied for third place in the conference, and were outscored by opponents by a combined total of 216 to 197.

The team's statistical leaders included Shawn Jones with 788 rushing yards, John Doerner with 877 passing yards, John Chesley with 350 receiving yards, and placekicker Larry Roach with 71 points scored.

The team played its home games at Lewis Field in Stillwater, Oklahoma.

Schedule

After the season

The 1982 NFL Draft was held on April 27–28, 1982. The following Cowboys were selected.

References

Oklahoma State
Oklahoma State Cowboys football seasons
Oklahoma State Cowboys football